Anna Green may refer to:

Anna Green (Hollyoaks), fictional character from the British soap opera Hollyoaks
Anna Katharine Green (1846–1935), American poet and novelist
Anna Green (footballer) (born 1990), New Zealand women's international football player

See also
Ann Green (disambiguation)